Brachycyttarus griseus, the grass bagworm, is a moth of the Psychidae family. It is native to south-east Asia, including Vietnam, Malaysia, Sabah and the Philippines, but has been introduced in Guam and Hawaii.

It is abundant in lawns, but is not considered to be a significant pest. Larvae have also been found feeding on Paspalurn conjugaturn and Zoysia pungens, but also on various ornamental plants such as Canna lilies and Anthuriums, where it scrapes holes in the leaves.

External links
A Geographical Distribution List Of Insects And Mites Associated With Cocoa, Derived From Literature Published Before 2010
Biological Control of Weeds: Southeast Asian Prospects

Psychidae
Moths described in 1929